Gulf Stream Magazine is a bi-annual literary magazine published by the Creative Writing Program at Florida International University. The headquarters of the magazine is in Miami, Florida.

History and profile
Gulf Stream Magazine was founded in 1989 by Lynne Barrett, who edited it until 2002 when John Dufresne became editor. The magazine is published biannually and carries fiction, poetry, creative non-fiction, interviews and reviews.

Among the major writers published in Gulf Stream are Ha Jin, James Carlos Blake, Sherman Alexie, Stuart Dybek, Peter Meinke, Maureen Seaton, Jacob M. Appel, Ann Hood, Ryan Shoemaker and Susan Neville.

See also 
 List of literary magazines

References

External links 
 

Literary magazines published in the United States
Biannual magazines published in the United States
Florida International University
Magazines established in 1989
Magazines published in Florida
1989 establishments in Florida
Mass media in Miami